The Girl of Gold is a 1925 American silent melodrama film directed by John Ince and starring Florence Vidor. It was released by Producers Distributing Corporation.

Plot
As described in a film magazine review, Helen Marrimore, daughter of a wealthy mine owner, is dubbed “The girl of gold” by society, and snubbed by them. She attends a house party under an assumed name, and she meets Schuyler Livingstone, and sister Ada, shorn of their wealth in Wall Street. Her father meets Schuyler through a motor accident and he decides his daughter shall marry Schuyler. He consents for his sister’s sake. At a spectacular ball she gives in the mine, Schuyler and Helen are caught in a cave-in. She learns the truth about her father’s bargain. They are then rescued.

Cast

Preservation
A copy of The Girl of Gold is preserved in a private collection and it has been released on dvd.

References

External links

 1925 ad

1925 films
American silent feature films
Films directed by John Ince
Producers Distributing Corporation films
American black-and-white films
Silent American drama films
1925 drama films
Melodrama films
1920s American films